A gizmo is a gadget, especially one whose real name is unknown or forgotten.

Gizmo may also refer to:

Technology
 The Gizmo or "Gizmotron", an effects device for electric guitars
 Gizmo key, found on certain flutes

 Gizmos, interactive online simulations for math and science education from ExploreLearning
 Gizmo, a 1996-2001 digital game distribution platform by Mplayer.com
 Goodyear GA-400R Gizmo, a one-man helicopter introduced in 1954

Entertainment
 The Gizmos, a 1970s proto-punk band
 Gizmo, a band formed in 2005 by Stewart Copeland
 "Gismo My Way", B-side to the 1974 single "The Wall Street Shuffle" by 10cc
 Gizmo!, a 1977 documentary film about inventions
 Gizmo, a 1999 play by Sir Alan Ayckbourn
 The Gizmo, a book series by Paul Jennings
 Gizmo (DC Comics), a character in the Teen Titans animated series
 Gizmo (Mirage Studios), a 1986 comic book series 
 Gizmo Duck, a character in the DuckTales series
 Gizmo, a character in the Gremlins films
 Don Gizmo, a character in the Fallout computer game
 Gizmo, a character in the comic strip Beetle Bailey
 Professor Gizmo, a character in the TV cartoon The Ruff and Reddy Show
 A Super Mario Maker 2 category of objects
 War with the Gizmos, a 1958 novel by Murray Leinster

Other uses
 Gizmo Williams (born 1962), former Canadian Football League player

See also 
 Gizmo5, a peer-to-peer internet telephony and instant messaging software application
 Gizmodo, a technology website
 Gizmondo, a handheld gaming console